Singer and songwriter Makhadzi has released seven studio albums and one extended play (EP).

Motorokisi was released on 1 November 2019 and debuted at number two in South Africa.

Her ninth studio album Kokovha was released on 16 October 2020. It debuted number one in South Africa  and certified 2× platinum in South Africa.

African Queen was released on 3 September 2021 as her tenth studio album, and was certified Gold. Its lead single Ghanama featuring Prince Benza and King Monada was certified double platinum in South Africa.

Albums

Studio albums

EP's

Singles

As lead artist

References 

Discographies of South African artists